Steve Penk is a British radio and television presenter. He was born in Rusholme, Manchester. Penk has worked for various national and local UK radio stations.  Aged just 16 he started his radio career at Piccadilly Radio in 1978 (subsequently rebranded Key 103), where his breakfast show delivered record ratings, the highest in the station's history to this day.

In 1997 Penk moved on to work at Capital Radio London presenting the mid-morning show.  On his programme he regularly did his famous radio wind-ups.  It was during one of these wind-up calls that Penk had the idea to call the then British Prime Minister, Tony Blair.  He was able to get through the No. 10 switchboard and managed to get Blair on the air for a few minutes. Blair later mentioned during Prime Minister's Questions that Penk had prank-called him that morning, and at that point it became a global media story.

In 2001, Penk moved to Virgin Radio where he replaced Chris Evans on the breakfast show and increased the audience by 300,000 listeners in the first three months. Penk then returned to Capital FM in 2002 to present a networked late show.

After a year presenting the late show on Capital Radio networked to a number of other stations, Penk returned to Manchester's Key 103, however, he left at the end of 2006. Penk returned to the airwaves on Fox FM in Oxfordshire in March 2007 as its new breakfast show presenter. However, he announced on 15 January 2008 he would be leaving the station by March 2008 due to 'internal politics'.

He also presented/Hosted a number of Primetime TV Shows for ITV. TV Nightmares, The Way They Were, When Athletes Attack and made guest appearances on Blankety Blank and a few series of TV's Naughtiest Blunders on ITV1.

On Thursday 4 September 2008, it was announced that Penk had bought the entire share capital in the radio station 96.2 the Revolution. Almost immediately after the purchase, Penk made major changes both to the schedule and to the playlist. The changes led to outrage from some listeners to the station and departure of some of the station's DJs. However, after changing the station's format Penk managed to quadruple the audience.

In January 2014, he sold 96.2 the Revolution.

In 2015 Penk launched the Steve Penk Wind-Up Channel on DAB+ in Manchester (England), featuring wind-up/prank calls 24/7.

In 2016 Penk created and launched "Radio Dead", a globally unique radio station that only plays artistes who are deceased. Penk closed Radio Dead along with another internet based station that he owned at the end of November 2019.

In 2019 he started a podcast of his BBC Radio 4 Extra series Radio Nightmares featuring mistakes and bloopers from all types of radio broadcasting across the world.

He stood in on the 10pm Saturday night show on Greatest Hits Radio in June 2021.

Television appearances
 TV Nightmares
 Would I Lie To You?
 Russian Roulette
 Blankety Blank
 The Way They Were: Coronation Street Special
 TV's Naughtiest Blunders
 This Morning

References

External links
 .
 DJ Penk quits Virgin Radio - BBC News - 31/01/02.
 Virgin drops Penk from breakfast show - BBC News - 25/01/02.
 Surprise call for PM - BBC News - 21/01/98.
Request for radio mistake clips - RadioToday - 28/05/19.
 New podast to launch - Podnews - 01/07/2019.

1961 births
Living people
People from Rusholme
DJs from Manchester
English radio DJs
Virgin Radio (UK)